Ian Vine (born 3 January 1974 in Portsmouth, England) is a British composer.  Vine spent his formative years in Libya and Hong Kong. He studied composition at the Royal Northern College of Music with Anthony Gilbert (b. 1934, UK) and privately with Simon Holt (b. 1958, UK).

One can detect traces of Near and Far Eastern modalities as well as gestural and formal elements in his music.  SIRI (1997), a frequently performed tour-de-force for solo percussion with electronics, uses a rhythmic and structural language found in the highly ritualised percussion music of Japan and Korea.

Although much of his work tends toward longer time frames, some of his pieces are very short.  Conversely, the pieces sound as if they are longer.  writing on water (1999-), commissioned by Matthew Herbert and released on the Accidental label, is an expanding collection of short (sometimes only 20 seconds long) works using recorded acoustic instruments;  and shadow grounds (1999), commissioned by the Huddersfield Contemporary Music Festival for the ensemble recherche as part of their In Nomine Broken Consort Book, a three-minute non-miniature of suspended sound.

His three black moons (1999), commissioned by the London Sinfonietta, was described by The Guardian, '...the most striking piece takes its title from an Alexander Calder mobile - its magical floating sonorities had a Feldmanesque beauty.'  Ian Vine is described as 'one of the most striking new voices to have come to light' (The Guardian), his music is performed across Europe and has been broadcast worldwide.

Ian Vine is the artistic director of new music ensemble Radius.

Key works
 white river sand (2002) - large ensemble
 espinas (1999) - large ensemble
 siri (1997) and siri2 (2000) - for solo percussion and percussion quartet respectively

Recordings
 forty works for Richard, self-released, not on label (2011)
 held/always/immer/gehalten, self-released, not on label (2012)
 frieze/static form/division, self-released, not on label (2014)
 forty objects/forty-five objects, self-released, not on label (2015)
 interstices, self-released, not on label (2015)
 copies I-V, self-released, not on label (2016)

works appear on
 writing on water (2000), on You Are Here, Accidental Records (2003)
 shadow grounds (1999), The Witten In Nomine Broken Consort Book, ensemble recherche, Kairos (2004)
 ocre oscuro (2007), on Jerwood Series 5, London Sinfonietta Label (2009)

External links

1974 births
Living people
Musicians from Portsmouth
20th-century classical composers
21st-century classical composers
English classical composers
English male classical composers
20th-century English composers
20th-century British male musicians
21st-century English composers
21st-century British male musicians